The 18th Army was an army level command of the German Army in World War I.  It was formed against France on 27 December 1917 from the former Heeresgruppe Woyrsch command.  It served exclusively on the Western Front and was dissolved on 2 January 1919.

History 
18th Army was one of three armies (along with 17th Army and 19th Army) formed in late 1917 / early 1918 with forces withdrawn from the Eastern Front.  They were in place to take part in Ludendorff's German spring offensive.  The Germans had realised that their only remaining chance of victory was to defeat the Allies before the overwhelming human and matériel resources of the United States could be deployed. They also had the temporary advantage in numbers afforded by nearly 50 divisions freed by the Russian withdrawal from the war (Treaty of Brest-Litovsk).

At the end of the war it was serving as part of Heeresgruppe Deutscher Kronprinz.

Order of Battle, 30 October 1918 
By the end of the war, the 18th Army was organised as:

Commanders 
18th Army was commanded throughout its existence by General der Infanterie Oskar von Hutier (previously commander of 8th Army).

Glossary 
Armee-Abteilung or Army Detachment in the sense of "something detached from an Army".  It is not under the command of an Army so is in itself a small Army.
Armee-Gruppe or Army Group in the sense of a group within an Army and under its command, generally formed as a temporary measure for a specific task.
Heeresgruppe or Army Group in the sense of a number of armies under a single commander.

See also 

18th Army (Wehrmacht) for the equivalent formation in World War II
German Army order of battle, Western Front (1918)

References

Bibliography 
 
 

18
Military units and formations established in 1917
Military units and formations disestablished in 1919